Trần Duy Khánh (born 20 July 1997) is a Vietnamese footballer who plays as a midfielder for Becamex Bình Dương.

Honours
Becamex Bình Dương
Vietnamese National Cup: 2018; Runner-up 2017
Vietnamese Super Cup: 2016; Runner-up 2019

References

External links

1997 births
Living people
Vietnamese footballers
Association football midfielders
V.League 1 players
Becamex Binh Duong FC players
People from Bình Dương Province